These are the results for the girls' doubles event at the 2018 Summer Youth Olympics.

Seeds

Main draw

Draw

References 
 Draw

Girls' doubles